Diphenylbutadiyne is the organic compound with the formula (C6H5C2)2.  It is a common diyne.  It is the product of the coupling of phenylacetylene often with copper reagents., but a variety of methods have been developed.

Diphenylbutadiyne forms a variety of metal-alkyne complexes.  One example is the organonickel complex (C5H5Ni)4C4(C6H5)2.

References

Conjugated diynes
Phenyl compounds
Alkyne derivatives